Evan Dexter O'Neal Parke (born January 2, 1968) is a Jamaican-born American actor perhaps best known for his role as Hayes in King Kong. Originally from Kingston, Jamaica, he was raised in Brooklyn, New York, and then on Long Island. He attended Cornell University (Class of 1990) where he majored in economics and was initiated into the Iota Phi chapter of Kappa Alpha Psi fraternity in 1989.

Filmography
Captain America: The Winter Soldier (2014) - S.H.I.E.L.D Agent 
Django Unchained (2012) - Baghead
All Roads Lead Home (2008) - Basham
Insanitarium (2008) - CharlesThe Air I Breathe (2007) - DannyKing Kong (2005) - HayesFellowship (2005) - Second Homeless ManKiss Kiss, Bang Bang (2005) - Dexter Clinic GuardNightstalker (2002)  - Lieutenant MayberryPlanet of the Apes (2001)  - GunnarThe Replacements (2000)  - Malcolm La MontThe Cider House Rules (1999)  - Jack

TelevisionGood Sam (2022) TV Series - Byron KingsleyThe First Lady (2022) TV Series - Allen TaylorStar Trek: Picard (2020) TV Series - Tenqem AdrevTell me a Story (2019) TV Series - Ken MorrisThe Blacklist (2018) TV Series - Detective Norman SingletonBlue Bloods (2017) TV Series - Duwan BrownThe Young and the Restless (2010-2012) TV Series - District Attorney, Spencer WalshDesperate Housewives (2010) TV Series - Derek YeagerWithout a Trace (2007) TV Series - Frank ColeLaw & Order: Criminal Intent (2006) TV Series - GorroE-Ring (2005) KamalCharmed (2005) TV Series - KahnDragnet (2003-2004) TV Series - Detective Raymond CooperSecond String (2002)  - MummsBrother's Keeper (2002)  - JuniorAlias (2001-2002) TV Series  - CharlieAs the World Turns  TV Series  - Judge Blanchard (1999)All My Children  TV Series - Rafe (1997-1998)

Video gamesPeter Jackson's King Kong (2005) - HayesDetroit: Become Human'' (2018) - Luther

References

External links

1968 births
Cornell Big Red football players
Jamaican emigrants to the United States
Jamaican male film actors
Jamaican male television actors
People from Brooklyn
Living people
Male actors from New York City
20th-century American male actors
21st-century American male actors
Yale School of Drama alumni
20th-century Jamaican male actors
21st-century Jamaican male actors